Bernard E. Pedersen (November 24, 1925 – November 6, 1996) was an American businessman and politician.

Born in Grinnell, Iowa, Pedersen served in the United States Army during World War II. He then received his bachelor's degree from Grinnell College. He owned an insurance business in Palatine, Illinois. He served in the Illinois House of Representatives as a Republican, from 1982 until his death in 1996. He died of cancer in Palatine, Illinois only a few hours after being reelected to office.

Notes

1925 births
1996 deaths
People from Grinnell, Iowa
People from Palatine, Illinois
Military personnel from Iowa
Grinnell College alumni
Businesspeople from Illinois
Republican Party members of the Illinois House of Representatives
Deaths from cancer in Illinois
20th-century American businesspeople
20th-century American politicians